The Grunge Years is a compilation album of songs by notable grunge bands released by Sub Pop in 1991. As indicated by the cover of the album, it was limited to a pressing of 500,000 copies.

Track listing
  "Dive"  - Nirvana    
  "Shove" - L7    
  "Stumblin' Man" - Tad    
  "Red Head Walking" - Beat Happening    
  "Ugly Sunday" - Mark Lanegan    
  "Change Has Come" - Screaming Trees    
  "Tomorrow" - Fluid    
  "Retarded" - Afghan Whigs    
  "House" - Babes in Toyland    
  "Come to Mind" - Mudhoney    
  "Long Black Veil" - The Walkabouts    
  "Between the Eyes" - Love Battery
  "Saddle Tramp" - Dickless

References

Grunge Years, The
Grunge Years, The
Grunge Years, The
Sub Pop compilation albums
Albums produced by Jack Endino